The Vikings were seafaring Scandinavians.

Viking or Vikings may also refer to:

Arts, entertainment, and media

Comics
 Viking (comics)
 Vikings #1 (2013), comic book prequel to the Vikings TV series
 Thor: Vikings, a comic book series

Films
 The Viking (1928 film), a color film about Viking settlers
 The Viking (1931 film), a black-and-white film about a hunter
 The Vikings (film), a 1958 adventure film starring Kirk Douglas
 Viking (2016 film), a 2016 Russian historical film
 Viking (2022 film), a 2022 Canadian science fiction comedy film

Music

Groups
 Viking (band), a 1980s metal band
 Los Vikings, a 1960 Salvadoran rock band
 The Vikings (1950s quartet), a barbershop quartet
 The Vikings (British band)
 The Vikings (South African band), a 1959–1961 rock and roll band

Albums
 Viking (album), by Lars Frederiksen and the Bastards
 Vikings (album), by New Politics
 Vikinger, by Danheim

Other uses in music
 The Vikings, a 1990s side project of Norwegian band Turbonegro
 Hagström Viking, a guitar
 Viking Records, a New Zealand independent record label

Radio
 Viking FM, a British independent radio station
 The Vikings (radio program), a radio program broadcast by NBC

Television
 Viking: The Ultimate Obstacle Course, a Japanese game show
 Vikings (2012 TV series), a BBC documentary series
 Vikings (TV series), a 2013 historical drama series
 Vikings: Valhalla, a 2022 sequel to the original drama series

Other arts, entertainment, and media
 Viking (comedy duo)
 Viking: Battle for Asgard, a 2008 game for Xbox 360 and PS3
 Viking Press, an American publishing company

Businesses

Manufacturers

Vehicle manufacturers
 Viking Air, a Canadian aircraft manufacturer
 Viking Cycle Company, a British bicycle manufacturer
 Viking Flying Boat Company, owned by Robert E. Gross

Other manufacturers
 Viking Range, a kitchen appliance manufacturer
 Viking Enterprise Solutions, formerly Viking Technology, Viking Interworks and Viking Modular Solutions, a division of the electronics manufacturing services provider Sanmina Corporation
 VSM Group (Viking Sewing Machines), a sewing machine manufacturer

Transport lines

Air
 Viking Airlines, a defunct private charter airline which was based in Stockholm, Sweden
 Scanair (airline call sign Viking), a defunct charter airline based in Stockholm, Sweden
 Sunclass Airlines (airline call sign Viking), formerly Thomas Cook Airlines Scandinavia, based in Denmark

Maritime
 Viking Line, a Finnish shipping line
 Viking River Cruises, based in Basel, Switzerland
 Viking Supply Ships, a supply shipping company based in Kristiansand, Norway

Other businesses
 Hotel Royal Christiania, formerly the Hotel Viking, in Oslo, Norway

Organizations
 Independent Order of Vikings, an American fraternal organization
 Task Force Viking, a US Army formation in the Iraq War
 The Vikings (reenactment group), a UK-based historical reenactment society

People
 Viking (given name)
 Viking (nickname)

Places
 Viking, a region of the North Sea used in the British Shipping Forecast
 Viking, Alberta, Canada, a town
 Viking, Minnesota, United States, a city
 Viking, Wisconsin, United States, an unincorporated community
 Viking Formation, a geological feature in Canada
 Viking Valley, Alexander Island, Antarctica

Sport

College and university sports
Several North American schools use the name "Vikings" for their sports teams, including:
 Augustana College (Illinois)
 Augustana College (South Dakota)
 Augustana University College, Alberta, Canada
 Bethany Lutheran College, Minnesota
 Cleveland State University, Ohio
 Lawrence University, Wisconsin
 Portland State University, Oregon
 Salem State University, Massachusetts
 University of Victoria, British Columbia, Canada (now named the Victoria Vikes)
 Waterloo Collegiate Institute, Ontario, Canada
 Western Washington University

American football
 Minnesota Vikings, an American football team
 Oslo Vikings, a Norwegian American football team
 University of Limerick Vikings, an Irish American football team

Association football (soccer)
 FC Vestsjælland, also known as FCV Vikings, a Danish football club
 FC Viikingit (FC Vikings), a Finnish football club
 Knattspyrnufélagið Víkingur, an Icelandic football club
 Viking FK, a Norwegian football club
 Viking Stadion, a football stadium in Stavanger, Norway
 Víkingur Gøta (Vikings Gøta), a football club in the Faroe Islands

Ice hockey
 Dunfermline Vikings, a defunct Scottish ice hockey team
 Elliot Lake Vikings, a Canadian Junior A ice hockey team
 Jamestown Vikings, a defunct American ice hockey team
 Nybro Vikings, a Swedish ice hockey team
 Southampton Vikings, a defunct English ice hockey team
 Tønsberg Vikings, a Norwegian ice hockey club
 HC Viking Tallinn, an Estonian ice hockey club
 Viking Award, given to the best Swedish ice hockey player in North America
 Viking Cup, a world ice hockey tournament in Camrose, Alberta, Canada
 Viking IK, a defunct ice hockey team in Stavanger, Norway
 Viking Hockey, Viking IK's successor

Rugby
 Bay Roskill Vikings, a New Zealand rugby league football club
 Canberra Vikings, an Australian rugby union football club
 Somerset Vikings, an English rugby league team
 Tuggeranong Vikings, an Australian rugby union club
 Widnes Vikings, an English rugby league club

Other sports
 Denmark Vikings, a Danish Australian rules football team
 Harstad Vikings, a defunct Norwegian basketball team
 Hull Vikings, a speedway motorcycle team in Hull, England
 Solna Vikings, a Swedish basketball team
 TIF Viking, a Norwegian sports club
 Viking Park, home stadium of the Tuggeranong Vikings
 Victorian Vikings, an Australian field hockey team
 Viking Håndball, a Norwegian handball club

Vehicles

Aircraft
 ASL Viking, a two-seater British biplane first flown in 1912
 Bellanca Viking, a four-seat American plane introduced in 1967
 Grob Viking, a Royal Air Force plane introduced in the 1980s
 Lockheed S-3 Viking, a U.S. Navy aircraft introduced in 1974
 St Andrews Viking, an American powered parachute design
 Vance Viking, an American single-seat cargo and racing aircraft first flown in 1932
 Vickers VC.1 Viking, a British airliner introduced in 1946
 Vickers Viking, a British military aircraft introduced in 1919

Land vehicles
 Viking (automobile), manufactured by Oldsmobile from 1929 to 1931
 BvS 10, an all-terrain armoured vehicle called Viking by the British Armed Forces

Rockets and spacecraft
 Viking (rocket), a series of sounding rockets
 Viking (rocket engine)
 Viking (satellite)
 Viking program, two NASA missions to Mars
 Viking 1
 Viking 2

Ships

Commercial and private
 Viking (barque), a Danish sailing ship, now used as a hotel
 Viking (replica Viking longship), a Norwegian replica of a Viking ship
 Empire Viking, several Empire Ships named Viking, see List of Empire ships (U–Z)
 , a fastcraft in the Isle of Man Steam Packet fleet
 , several motorships
 , a steam-powered sealing ship used to film The Viking (1931 film)
 , also named HMS Vindex
 Viking Line,  a Finnish ferry and cruise operator, and its ships:
 , a Viking Line fast cruise ferry
 , a planned but canceled Viking Line ferry
 Viking, a passenger ferry built in 1905, later renamed HMS Vindex

Naval
 , several British Royal Navy ships
 HNoMS Viking (1891), a Royal Norwegian Navy gunboat
 , various United States Navy ships
 Viking class submarine, a planned but canceled European submarine class

Other uses
 MP-446 Viking, a Russian semi-automatic pistol
 Viking Link, a planned submarine power cable between the United Kingdom and Denmark
 Viking Wind Farm, a proposed Shetland Islands wind farm

See also

 
 
 Viking Aircraft (disambiguation)
 Wiking (disambiguation)